Chelsea Walton  is a mathematician whose research interests include  noncommutative algebra, noncommutative algebraic geometry, symmetry in quantum mechanics, Hopf algebras, and quantum groups. She is an associate professor at Rice University and a Sloan Research Fellow.

Education and career
Walton is African-American, originally from Detroit, Michigan, and was educated in the Detroit public schools.
As a child she made a letter frequency table from her children's dictionary, and as a high school student, seeking a way to "do logic puzzles all day and get paid for this", she was already planning a career as a mathematics professor.

She graduated from Michigan State University in 2005, and completed her Ph.D. at the University of Michigan in 2011.

Walton did postdoctoral research at the University of Washington and the Mathematical Sciences Research Institute, and became a C. L. E. Moore instructor at the Massachusetts Institute of Technology from 2012 to 2015. She came to Temple University as Selma Lee Bloch Brown Assistant Professor of Mathematics in 2015 . She moved to the University of Illinois in 2018. She joined the faculty at Rice University in 2020.

Recognition
Walton was named a Sloan Fellow in 2017, becoming the fourth African-American to win a Sloan Fellowship in mathematics. Walton was also recognized by Mathematically Gifted & Black as a Black History Month 2017 Honoree. In 2018 she won the André Lichnerowicz Prize in Poisson geometry, the first woman to be awarded this prize. The award citation noted her research on Sklyanin algebras in Poisson geometry, on the actions of Hopf algebras, and on the universal enveloping algebra of the Witt algebra.

References

Further reading

External links
Home page

1983 births
Living people
21st-century American mathematicians
American women mathematicians
African-American mathematicians
Michigan State University alumni
University of Michigan alumni
Massachusetts Institute of Technology School of Science faculty
Temple University faculty
University of Illinois Urbana-Champaign faculty
Sloan Research Fellows
21st-century women mathematicians
21st-century American women
21st-century African-American women
21st-century African-American people
20th-century African-American people
20th-century African-American women